Finazzi is an Italian surname. Notable people with the surname include:

Alexandre Finazzi (born 1973), Brazilian footballer and manager
Lucas Finazzi (born 1990), Brazil-born Italian footballer

See also
Tinazzi

Italian-language surnames